Gustavo Nakatani Ávila (15 October 1949 – 13 May 2020), known professionally as Yoshio, was a Mexican singer of Japanese descent whose greatest hits were in the 1970s and 1980s.

Biography 
Yoshio was the son of Yoshigei Nakatani Moriguchi, the Japanese-born entrepreneur and creator of Japanese-style peanuts in Mexico, and Mexican-born wife Ema Ávila Espinoza, and the youngest of 8 siblings, including artist Carlos Nakatani. As a young child, he was given the nickname of "Yoshio" by his father, after not only showing his talent as a singer, but also because of his big heart and passion for life. Soon after, the family started calling Gustavo by the nickname. Yoshio means noble man in Japanese. Yoshio continued helping out in his father's business, at the same time as he was training his voice for singing.

His great hits are a reflection of his heritage and style, such as the song "Samurai". Among his other hits are the songs "Lo Que Pasó, Pasó", "Reina de Corazones" and "A Mi Manera" (a Spanish-language translation of "My Way").

On 30 April 2020, he was admitted at the Xoco hospital, where he was at first diagnosed with salmonellosis, and later with COVID-19, He died in the hospital on 13 May, at age 70 during the COVID-19 pandemic in Mexico. It was later revealed that he contracted the virus in the hospital. His remains were cremated.

See also
 Japanese community of Mexico City

References

External links
 

1949 births
2020 deaths
Mexican singers
Mexican people of Japanese descent
Deaths from the COVID-19 pandemic in Mexico